Singapore was represented at the 2006 Commonwealth Games in Melbourne by a 101-member strong contingent comprising 63 sportspersons and 38 officials. Singapore won a total of 18 medals, 5 of them gold; its best ever performance at the Commonwealth Games.

Medallists

Athletics

Field events

Women

Badminton

Men

Women

Mixed

Gymnastics

Artistic

Men 
Ho was the first gymnast to qualify for the Commonwealth games and was the only gymnast representing Singapore.

Netball

The Singapore national netball team qualified for the Commonwealth games by winning the 2005 Asian Netball Championships held in Singapore. The win qualified the team as the Asian team of the 5 international netball regions by the International Netball Federation. This is the first time Singapore compete in the Netball event of the Games.

 Summary

 Roster

Pool B

Semi-final

11th Place match

Shooting

Men

Women

Swimming

Men

Women

Table Tennis

Singles

Doubles

Team

References 

2006
Nations at the 2006 Commonwealth Games
Commonwealth Games